The Spaulding Rehabilitation Hospital is a 132-bed rehabilitation teaching hospital located in Boston, Massachusetts. It is the official teaching hospital for Harvard Medical School’s Department of Physical Medicine and Rehabilitation and the main campus of the Spaulding Rehabilitation Network. The hospital is a member of Partners Continuing Care under Partners HealthCare, a non-profit organization that owns several hospitals in Massachusetts.

Reputation
Spaulding Rehabilitation Hospital has been the only hospital in New England to be continuously ranked by the U.S. News & World Report in its Best Hospitals Survey since 1995. In 2018, the hospital was ranked #2.

History
Spaulding Rehabilitation Hospital was founded in 1971 as the Massachusetts Rehabilitation Hospital. The former location was in the West End of Boston, located behind North Station at 125 Nashua Street.

Redevelopment
Its new 300,000 sq. ft, $220 million facility is located on Parcel 6 in the Charlestown Navy Yard and opened for service on April 27, 2013.

Spaulding Rehabilitation Network
The Spaulding Rehabilitation Network includes:

Spaulding Rehabilitation Hospital - Main campus
Spaulding Rehabilitation Hospital Cape Cod -Formerly Rehabilitation Hospital of the Cape and Islands
Spaulding Hospital Cambridge - Long-term care facility
Spaulding Hospital North Shore - Long-term care facility
Spaulding Nursing and Therapy Center North End
Spaulding Nursing and Therapy Center West Roxbury
Clark House at Fox Village - skilled nursing facility
Twenty three outpatient sites throughout the Greater Boston area.

References

External links
 Spaulding Rehabilitation Hospital Network

Hospital buildings completed in 1971
Hospitals in Boston
Harvard Medical School
Rehabilitation hospitals
Hospitals established in 1971